Reginald George Joseph Gregson (13 February 1891 – 17 January 1938) was an Australian rules footballer who played with St Kilda in the Victorian Football League (VFL).

Notes

External links 

1891 births
1938 deaths
Australian rules footballers from Victoria (Australia)
St Kilda Football Club players
Dandenong Football Club players